H.B. No. 308, also known as the Merry Christmas bill is a Texas bill that was signed into law by Gov. Rick Perry on June 14, 2013. The law states that:

 WINTER CELEBRATIONS. 
 (a)  A school district may educate students about the history of traditional winter celebrations, and allow students and district staff to offer traditional greetings regarding the celebrations, including:
   (1)  "Merry Christmas";
   (2)  "Happy Hanukkah"; and
   (3)  "happy holidays."
 (b)  Except as provided by Subsection (c), a school district may display on school property scenes or symbols associated with traditional winter celebrations, including a menorah or a Christmas image such as a nativity scene or Christmas tree, if the display includes a scene or symbol of:
   (1)  more than one religion; or
   (2)  one religion and at least one secular scene or symbol.
 (c)  A display relating to a traditional winter celebration may not include a message that encourages adherence to a particular religious belief.

Criticism

Victor Cornell of the American Civil Liberties Union has criticized the bill, asserting that the U.S. Supreme Court has prohibited religious practice being endorsed by schools unless it has a "secular instructional purpose",

Notes

External links
 Text of HB 308
 http://www.merrychristmasbill.com

Texas statutes
2013 in Texas
2013 legislation
Christmas in Texas